Stardust is a single screen multidirectional shooter video game for the Amiga, released by the Finnish company Bloodhouse in 1993.  The game is essentially an Asteroids clone with enhancements, such as power-ups, shields, a high-energy techno module soundtrack, vivid use of colors and the occasional tunnel section that revolves around a sphere. The game's graphics drew critical acclaim for the aforementioned tunnels and the liberal use of ray-tracing. The company has since merged with Terramarque to form Housemarque.

In a not atypical bout of Finnish humor, the developers gave several things ludicrous names in their own language, which were (and still are) highly obscure in the international market. The damsel in distress is named after a brand of margarine, and the final confrontation takes place over the planet Imatra.

Ports
The game was ported to MS-DOS, but not by the original programmers. This version was buggy, scant on details found in the Amiga version and severely lacking in both control and gameplay polish.

A conversion was made for the Atari STE by Aggression demoscene crew, published in 1995 by Daze Marketing. It is one of the few STE exclusive games, and uses the machine's updated capabilities.

Legacy
An enhanced sequel was released for AGA Amigas, Amiga CD32, and finally for the IBM PC compatible platform as well. Named Super Stardust (or Super Stardust '96), the game features a CD soundtrack from Slusnik Luna, FMV cut-scenes, high speed gameplay and completely new levels and enemies.

In April 2007, Sony Computer Entertainment released Super Stardust HD as a downloadable PlayStation Network game for the PlayStation 3.

In February 2012, Super Stardust Delta was released on the PlayStation Network as a downloadable title for the PlayStation Vita.

References

External links 
 Stardust at the Housemarque website
 Stardust at Atari Mania
 

1993 video games
Amiga games
Atari ST games
Amiga CD32 games
DOS games
Europe-exclusive video games
Multidirectional shooters
Video games developed in Finland
Video game clones
Single-player video games